Jane Shore (c. 1445 – c. 1527) was the mistress of Edward IV of England.

Jane Shore may also refer to:

Jane Shore (poet), American poet and professor of English
Jane Shore (play), a 1714 play by Nicholas Rowe based on the life of Jane Shore, the mistress of Edward IV
Jane Shore (1911 film)
Jane Shore (1915 film), a British silent historical film adapted from the 1714 play The Tragedy of Jane Shore
Jane Shore (1922 film)

See also
Jane Shaw (disambiguation)